"Tell Me What You Dream" is a song written by Timothy B. Schmit, Josh Leo and Vince Melamed. While first performed on Schmit's solo album Playin' It Cool, its most well-known version was performed by country group Restless Heart along with saxophonist Warren Hill. The single was the group's only number one on the adult contemporary chart, spending two weeks on top, and despite previous country chart success, the song did not make the country top 40. "Tell Me What You Dream" narrowly missed the Top 40 on the Billboard Hot 100, peaking at number forty-three.

Music video
The music video was directed by Daniela Federici and premiered in early 1993.

Chart performance

References

1993 singles
Restless Heart songs
Songs written by Josh Leo
Songs written by Vince Melamed
Song recordings produced by Josh Leo
1993 songs
RCA Records Nashville singles